Biser may refer to:

Biser (given name)
Biser (magazine), a 1912–1919 Bosnian cultural magazine
Biser, Bulgaria, a village in Haskoro Province, Bulgaria
Biser, Russia, an urban locality (a settlement) in Gornozavodsky District of Perm Krai, Russia
Biser Point, a rocky point in Antarctica
Daniel S. Biser (1801–1877), American politician